Socialist International Women is the international organization of the women's organizations of the socialist, social democratic and labour parties affiliated to the Socialist International.

History
The  Women's International Council of Socialist and Labour Organizations was established on August 17, 1907, at the First  International Conference of Socialist Women held in Stuttgart. This body constituted the Women's International Secretariat of the Second International and was led by Clara Zetkin. The Socialist International Women trace their origins to this body, through a series of subsequent organisations.

It was named International Socialist Women's Committee founded in 1926 under Edith Kemmis as the women's section of the Labour and Socialist International. This organisation lasted until 1940, when its work came to a halt as a result of the Second World War. 

The organisation was refounded in 1955 as the International Council of Social Democratic Women, based in London, following the foundation of the Socialist International in 1951. As the women's section of this organisation it then took on the name of the Socialist International Women in 1978.

Members
The following organizations are Socialist International Women members:

See also 
International Socialist Women's Conferences

References 

Political organisations based in London
Organizations established in 1955
Socialist International
International women's organizations
Socialist organizations